Portrait in Black is a 1960 American neo-noir melodrama film directed by Michael Gordon, and starring Lana Turner and Anthony Quinn. Produced by Ross Hunter, the film was based on the play of the same by name by Ivan Goff and Ben Roberts, who also wrote the screenplay. The film was distributed by Universal-International. This was the final film appearance by actress Anna May Wong.

Plot
San Francisco socialite Sheila Cabot (Lana Turner) becomes increasingly disturbed as she cares for her ailing, disagreeable husband (Lloyd Nolan). Along the way, she falls in love with Dr. David Rivera (Anthony Quinn), who is tending her husband. This leads to a series of unfortunate events, resulting in the death of the husband and an ensuing murder investigation that reveals a surprise culprit.

Cast
 Lana Turner as Sheila Cabot
 Anthony Quinn as Dr. David Rivera
 Richard Basehart as Howard Mason
 Sandra Dee as Cathy Cabot
 John Saxon as Blake Richards
 Ray Walston as Cobb
 Virginia Grey as Miss Lee
 Anna May Wong as Tawny
 Dennis Kohler as Peter Cabot
 Lloyd Nolan as Matthew S. Cabot
 Elizabeth Chan as Chinese dancer
 John Wengraf as Dr. Kessler
 John McNamara as Minister
 George Womack as Foreman
 Paul Birch as Detective lieutenant

Production notes
Portrait in Black was filmed in and around San Francisco, including a sequence at Devil's Slide on the Pacific Coast Highway (State Route 1).

It was the last of three screen teamings between Sandra Dee and John Saxon.

Home video release
Portrait in Black was released on DVD in Region 1 as a Lana Turner double feature with Madame X by Universal Studios Home Entertainment on February 5, 2008. It was released on Blu-ray disc by Kino Lorber on May 28, 2019.

The play
The film was based on a play that had premiered in London at the Piccadilly Theatre in 1946 and had a short run on Broadway the following year. The writers, Ivan Goff and Ben Roberts, had worked on it for 13 months.

Film rights were sold almost immediately, to Universal, for a reported $100,000 against a sliding percentage of the gross to reach a maximum of 15% at $2.5 million. A clause was added that if a film was not released by June 30, 1950, the rights would revert to the authors and they would keep the $100,000. Diana Wynyard appeared in the London production and her husband Carol Reed was going to direct the film version. However, he disagreed with Universal about how best to adapt it. Another director, Michael Gordon, encountered similar difficulties. In 1948, Goff approached Universal to buy the project back but balked at the studio's demand for $316,000. When the June 30, 1950 deadline passed, the project reverted to the authors. They tried finance the film with Michael Gordon and Joan Crawford.

Reception
The film was not well received critically but did well at the box office, earning $3,600,000 in theatrical rentals in the United States and Canada in 1960.

Radio adaptation 
Portrait in Black was presented on Theatre Guild on the Air on March 2, 1952. The one-hour adaptation starred Barbara Stanwyck and Richard Widmark.

See also
 List of American films of 1960

References

Notes

Bibliography
Schwartz, Ronald. Neo-Noir: The New Film Noir Style from Psycho to Collateral, 2005 (Portrait In Black listed on p. 127). Scarecrow Press, Lanham, Maryland. .

External links
 
 
 
 
 
Review of play at Variety

1960 films
1960 crime drama films
1960s crime thriller films
American crime drama films
American crime thriller films
American films based on plays
Films directed by Michael Gordon
Films produced by Ross Hunter
Films set in San Francisco
Films set in the San Francisco Bay Area
Films shot in San Francisco
Universal Pictures films
Films scored by Frank Skinner
American neo-noir films
1960s English-language films
1960s American films